Copelatus brasiliensis is a species of diving beetle. It is part of the genus Copelatus in the subfamily Copelatinae of the family Dytiscidae. It was described by Zimmermann in 1921.

References

brasiliensis
Beetles described in 1921